James E. Johnson (June 6, 1879 – January 19, 1942) was an American football player. He was elected to the College Football Hall of Fame in 1969.

Biography
Johnson was born on June 6, 1879 in Edgerton, Wisconsin.
Johnson, one-half Stockbridge Indian, attended Carlisle Indian Industrial School from 1899 to 1903, where he starred on the Carlisle football team. Coached by Pop Warner, the team was composed entirely of American Indian students and was a true national powerhouse in the early 20th century. In 1903, Walter Camp named Johnson as the All-American quarterback. Johnson also served as Carlisle's team captain in the same season. Following his career at Carlisle, Johnson enrolled in Northwestern's Dental School and played on the football team during the 1904 and 1905 seasons, also becoming a team captain for Northwestern and leading the team to success despite a depleted roster. Following his playing career, Johnson became a dental surgeon in San Juan, Puerto Rico. He died at the Mayo Clinic in Minnesota in 1942.

Johnson was posthumously inducted into the College Football Hall of Fame in 1969.

References

1879 births
1942 deaths
19th-century players of American football
American football quarterbacks
Carlisle Indians football players
Northwestern Wildcats football players
All-American college football players
College Football Hall of Fame inductees
People from Edgerton, Wisconsin
Players of American football from Wisconsin
Native American players of American football
Stockbridge–Munsee Community people